Thieves of Innocence is a Canadian documentary film, directed by Paul Arcand and released in 2005. An exploration of Quebec's system of child protection, the film profiles several past and present wards of the system, presenting an argument that the agency is highly bureaucratic and failing many of the children it attempts to serve.

The film was a Genie Award nominee for Best Feature Length Documentary at the 26th Genie Awards.

References

External links 
 

2005 films
Canadian documentary films
Films set in Quebec
Films shot in Quebec
French-language Canadian films
2000s Canadian films